J. Scott Radecic (born June 14, 1962) is a former American football linebacker who played twelve seasons in the National Football League (NFL).

Graduating from Brentwood High School in 1980, he played college football at Penn State University, where he was an Academic All-American in 1982. His brother Keith also played at Penn State and in the NFL for the St. Louis Cardinals in 1987.

Scott is currently a Senior Principal at Populous, where he serves as the principal in charge of projects in collegiate sports, the NFL and elite athletic training facilities.

References

American football linebackers
Players of American football from Pittsburgh
Kansas City Chiefs players
Buffalo Bills players
Indianapolis Colts players
Penn State Nittany Lions football players
1962 births
Living people